Common space(s)

 CommonSpace, a news website

See also
 Common Economic Space (disambiguation)